Our Time in Eden is the fifth studio album by American alternative rock band 10,000 Maniacs. It was released in 1992 on Elektra Records. The release is 10,000 Maniacs' last studio album with original lead singer Natalie Merchant. The album included her future replacement Mary Ramsey on violin and viola on such tracks as "Stockton Gala Days" and "How You've Grown". Singles released from the album were "These Are Days", "Candy Everybody Wants" and "Few and Far Between". The brass and woodwind section is covered by the J.B.'s, or James Brown's band. The album had the working title African Violet Society.

Track listing
All songs written by Natalie Merchant, except as noted.

"Noah's Dove" – 4:29
"These Are Days" (Robert Buck, Merchant) – 3:40
"Eden" (Buck, Dennis Drew, Steven Gustafson, Jerome Augustyniak, Merchant) – 4:07
"Few and Far Between" – 3:13
"Stockton Gala Days" (Buck, Drew, Gustafson, Augustyniak, Merchant) – 4:18
"Gold Rush Brides" (Buck, Merchant) – 3:22
"Jezebel" – 4:00
"How You've Grown" – 3:39
"Candy Everybody Wants" (Drew, Merchant) – 3:04
"Tolerance" – 4:13
"Circle Dream" (Buck, Drew, Gustafson, Augustyniak, Merchant) – 3:25
"If You Intend" – 3:01
"I'm Not the Man" – 3:24

Personnel

10,000 Maniacs
Natalie Merchant – vocals, piano
Robert Buck – electric and acoustic guitars, electric sitar, banjo, pedal and lap steel guitars, mandocello
Dennis Drew – Hammond organ, piano, keyboards, accordion
Steven Gustafson – bass guitar
Jerome Augustyniak – drums, percussion

Additional musicians
The J.B. horns – horns on "Few and Far Between" and "Candy Everybody Wants":
Maceo Parker – alto saxophone
Alfred "Pee Wee" Ellis – tenor saxophone
Fred Wesley – trombone
Mary Ramsey – violin on "Stockton Gala Days", viola on "How You've Grown"
Paulinho Da Costa – percussion on "These Are Days", "Candy Everybody Wants" and "Circle Dream"
Charles Fleischer – harmonica on "Gold Rush Brides"
Kim Laskowski – bassoon on "I'm Not the Man"
Atsuko Sato – bassoon on "I'm Not the Man"

String quartet on "Jezebel"
Larry Corbett – cello
Bruce Dukov – violin
Pamela Goldsmith – viola
Ralph Morrison – violin

Technical
Paul Fox – producer
Ed Thacker – engineer, mixing
Paul Buckmaster – string quartet arranger and conductor
Michael Reiter – second engineer
Scott Blockland – second engineer (mixing)
Stephen Marcussen – mastering
Rob Marinissen – photography
Frank Olinsky – package design
Natalie Merchant – package design

Charts

Weekly charts

Year-end charts

References

1992 albums
10,000 Maniacs albums
Albums produced by Paul Fox (record producer)
Elektra Records albums